The  second season of La Voz premiered January 19, 2020 on Telemundo. Wisin, Alejandra Guzmán, Luis Fonsi and Carlos Vives returned as coaches from the previous season. Meanwhile, Jorge Bernal and Jacqueline Bracamontes continued as hosts, joined by Nastassja Bolívar as the backstage reporter. This season also featured a fifth coach, Mau y Ricky, who selected contestants to participate in The Comeback Stage.

On Sunday, August 16, 2020, Sammy Colon was announced the second season winner of the Spanish-language version of The Voice US, alongside his coach, Carlos Vives. He won the prize of US$200,000 and a contract with Universal Music Group.

Coaches 

In October 2019, it was officially announced that the show was renewed for a second season and would premiere January 19, 2020. The coaching panel remained the same, with Wisin, Alejandra Guzmán, Luis Fonsi, and Carlos Vives all returning alongside Jorge Bernal, and Jacqueline Bracamontes who returned as hosts. Backstage reporter, Jéssica Cediel did not return for the second season. Later, it was announced Nastassja Bolívar would replace Cediel. This season featured The Comeback Stage as seen on season 15 & season 16 of the English-language version, with duo Mau y Ricky as coach.

The advisors for the Battle round include: Mario Domm for Team Wisin, Jesse & Joy for Team Guzmán, Karol G for Team Fonsi, and Sebastián Yatra for Team Vives.

Teams 
 Color key

Blind Auditions 
In the Blind Auditions, each coach had to complete their teams with 12 contestants. Each coach had two Blocks to prevent another of the coaches from getting a contestant. Six participants who got no chair turn were chosen to participate on The Comeback Stage.

NOTE:  For consistency reasons, the "Quiero Tu Voz" button is referred by its English title, as recognised in summaries of other national versions of the franchise.

Color key

Episode 1 (January 19)

Episode 2 (January 26)

Episode 3 (February 2)

Episode 4 (February 9)

Episode 5 (February 16)

Episode 6 (February 23)

Episode 7 (March 1)

The Battles 
The Battle Rounds started on March 8. Season two advisors include: Mario Domm for Team Wisin, Jesse & Joy for Team Guzmán, Karol G for Team Fonsi, and Sebastián Yatra for Team Vives. The coaches can steal one losing artist from other coaches. Contestants who win their battle or are stolen by another coach will advance to the Cross Battles.

Color key:

The Comeback Stage 
For this season, the show added a brand new phase of competition called The Comeback Stage that was exclusive to the Telemundo App, La Voz YouTube Channel, Instagram, Twitter and Telemundo.com. After failing to turn a chair in the blind auditions, artists had the chance to be selected by fifth coach Mau y Ricky to become a member of their six-person team. The Comeback Stage consists of three rounds: The Battles, Semifinals and Finale. In the Finale, the public decides who wins, who will officially join one of the four main teams for the Semifinals.

The first episode explained the format of The Comeback Stage. The Digital Episodes were available Mondays at 10am/9c on Twitter Live, and were later available on all other digital platforms.

The Battles
The Battles were part of the main show's Battle segment. Like the show itself, two artist faced each other in a same song battle, and only one advanced based on their coach's choice.

Semifinal
The Semifinal was part of the transition between the Battles and Cross Battles segment of the show. Due to the COVID-19 pandemic, this phase was not shown until the return of the show after the pause. Mau y Ricky chose two artists to advance and the other one was eliminated.

Finale
The Finale was part of the Cross Battle segment of the show. The performances for both artists were on August 3rd, with results being announced on Episode 14 and the winner becoming a Semifinalist. Aaron Barrios received the highest votes and chose to join Team Wisin.

Final Phase 
The Live Shows were originally scheduled to start April 5, however owing to the COVID-19 outbreak, NBC delayed the Live Shows until July 26.  Unlike the English-language version filmed in California, which used a remote format, the Spanish-language version filmed in Florida, complying with Film Florida recommendations.  Shows were same-day delay coverage, recorded that afternoon to comply with Film Florida recommendations before their airing that evening. 

This season, phone calls and text messaging voting methods were removed, leaving Comcast-related sites (Telemundo's Web site and app, along with Xfinity X1) as the only options for voting.

Color key:

Week 1 & 2: Cross Battles (July 26 & August 2) 
 
This season, the Playoffs were replaced by the Cross Battles which compromised episodes 12 and 13. Also, this season the beginning of the "Live Shows" featured a Top 28 instead of a Top 32. Each night featured seven pairs, where coaches selected an artist from their team, then challenged a fellow coach to compete against, and this coach selected an artist as well. The artist with the highest public's votes from each cross battle advanced, with the other artist being automatically eliminated.

This version was the first United States version to return contestants to perform in studio since the pandemic, as it was held under Florida guidelines; the English-language version that had resumed in April had contestants and coaches perform at their homes, as it was held under California guidelines.

Due to a limited number of seating spots in the main stage for participants, and following social distancing, as well as other safety precautions and guidelines of the Centers for Disease Control and Prevention and Film Florida, four contestants -- Sugeily Cardona, Julio Castillo, Santiago Ramos and Alonso Garcia -- performed from a remote room backstage which was displayed on the stage's screen.

Week 3: Semifinal (August 9) 
During the episode, the results for both nights of Cross Battles were announced one by one. After announcing the winner, his/her Semifinal performance followed. After the fourteen results and performances were  announced, Aaron Barrios was revealed as The Comeback Stage winner. He decided to join the Top 15 on Team Wisin.

This season all teams had a different amount of artists. Team Fonsi & Team Vives advanced with five members each. Team Guzmán & Team Wisin advanced with two members each, but with The Comeback Stage artist Wisin advanced with three.

Week 4: Finale (August 16) 
The final episode was filmed on Sunday, August 16th with same-day coverage that night. It featured group performances from the coaches with their team members, followed by group performances of the semi-finalists and solo performances of the coaches and guests. After performance #9, 10, 11, 12 a group of three to four people were called up to the stage and on each occasion one of the artists was announced as a finalist. At the end of the evening the Top 4 results were announced.

Final result

Elimination Chart

Overall 
Color key
Artist's info

Result details

Teams 
Color key
Artist's info

Results details

Artists' appearance on other shows 
 Adrián Torres, Jose Class and Albin St. Rose all competed on the show's first season but failed to turn any chairs.
 Steven Sibaja participated in the eight season of Mexican version where he was part of Team Belinda.
 Maria Cristina Bravo and Gabriel Carrero competed in the second season of La Banda, but failed to reach the second and third phase of the competition, respectively.
 Angely Rabsatt competed on the second season of La Voz Kids and reached the semifinals on team Royce.
 Janine Rivera participated on the tenth season of Estrella TV's show Tengo Talento, Mucho Talento where she reached the finale.
 Emily Piriz participated in season 13 of American Idol where she placed 12th place.
 Setareh Khatibi appeared on the sixth season of Nuestra Belleza Latina and finished second.
 Julio Cesar Castillo competed in the third season of the U.S English version, but was eliminated in the Live Playoffs.
 Karen Galera competed on the sixteenth season of the U.S English version, but was eliminated during the Live Cross Battles.
 Brian Cruz won the second season of La Banda where he was part of the band named MIX5.

Ratings

References 

2020 American television seasons
United States
Television productions suspended due to the COVID-19 pandemic